Yadier Pedroso González (June 9, 1986 – March 16, 2013), born in Guanajay, Havana Province, Cuba, was a right-handed pitcher for the Cuban national baseball team and La Habana of the Cuban National Series. Pedroso was part of the Cuban team at the 2006 and 2013 World Baseball Classics.

Pedroso, then 19 years old, went 8-5 with a 3.58 ERA for La Habana during the 2005-06 Cuban National Series, as part of a strong staff featuring two other members of the national team, Jonder Martínez and Yulieski González.

He died in a traffic accident at age 26.

References

External links
 

1986 births
2013 deaths
2006 World Baseball Classic players
2009 World Baseball Classic players
2013 World Baseball Classic players
Baseball players at the 2008 Summer Olympics
Baseball players at the 2011 Pan American Games
Olympic baseball players of Cuba
Olympic medalists in baseball
Olympic silver medalists for Cuba
Medalists at the 2008 Summer Olympics
Vaqueros de la Habana players
Road incident deaths in Cuba
Pan American Games bronze medalists for Cuba
Pan American Games medalists in baseball
Central American and Caribbean Games gold medalists for Cuba
Competitors at the 2006 Central American and Caribbean Games
Central American and Caribbean Games medalists in baseball
Medalists at the 2011 Pan American Games
People from Artemisa Province